Cassidy Benintente (born June 12, 1994) is an American former professional soccer player who last played as a defender and midfielder for Sky Blue FC of the National Women's Soccer League (NWSL).

Raised in Jackson Township, New Jersey, Benitente played prep soccer at Jackson Liberty High School.

References

External links
 
 LinkedIn profile

1994 births
Living people
American women's soccer players
NJ/NY Gotham FC players
National Women's Soccer League players
People from Jackson Township, New Jersey
Rutgers Scarlet Knights women's soccer players
Sportspeople from Ocean County, New Jersey
Women's association football defenders
Women's association football midfielders